Deh-e Mohsen (also Romanized as Deh-e Moḩsen) is a village in Qorqori Rural District, Qorqori District, Hirmand County, Sistan and Baluchestan Province, Iran. At the 2006 census, its population was 124, in 24 families.

References 

Populated places in Hirmand County